Dawn of Iron Blades is a full-length album by the Polish black metal band Graveland. Dawn of Iron Blades was also released as A5-digibook (limited to 1500) and gatefold 2xLP. Some of the lyrics were written by Garhard III from Austrian pagan metal band Woodtemple.

Track listing
 "Iron in the Fog" – 9:29
 "Semper Fidelis" – 9:28
 "Immortal Bloodline" – 7:26
 "To the North of Rubicon" – 7:41
 "Crown Heroic My Departure" – 6:09
 "While I Ride with the Valkyries" – 11:21

References

2004 albums
Graveland albums